Gabrielle "Billie" V. Calizo-Quimpo (born in Balete, Aklan) is a Filipina politician. She is daughter of late Balete Mayor Teodoro F. Calizo. She is married to Reynaldo "Boy" Quimpo.

Political career 
She served as Provincial Board Member in Aklan from 1998 to 2001. Calizo-Quimpo served as Representative from lone district of Aklan from 2001 to 2004 and she succeeded by Florencio T. Miraflores. She was the Vice Governor of Aklan from 2007 to 2016 and succeeded by her husband, Reynaldo "Boy" Quimpo. After her term as Vice Governor, she is Consultant at Provincial Government of Aklan.

Calizo-Quimpo received the award called Philippines Awards Best Practices in 'eGovernance' for LGUs held in Philippine International Convention Center. In 2013, one of her legacy during her term is the Construction of Kalibo - Numancia Bridge.

Further reading

References

Living people
Liberal Party (Philippines) politicians
Members of the House of Representatives of the Philippines from Aklan
People from Aklan
Nacionalista Party politicians
20th-century Filipino politicians
20th-century Filipino women politicians
21st-century Filipino politicians
21st-century Filipino women politicians
Year of birth missing (living people)